Alucita cinnerethella is a moth of the family Alucitidae. It is found in Palestine.

References

Moths described in 1935
Alucitidae
Moths of the Middle East